The Democratic National Alliance (DNA) is a political party in Antigua and Barbuda founded on April 18, 2017. The DNA is currently led by former MP and Senator Joanne Massiah. The party was founded after a disastrous leadership race within the United Progressive Party (which Massiah and her team withdrew from) following their defeat in the 2014 General Elections.  

Following UPP's Convention in 2015, Joanne Massiah, the then-elected Member of Parliament for All Saint's East and St. Luke, was expelled from the party on February 12, 2017.

Party Officers 

 President – Col. Joanne Massiah
 1st Vice President – Col. Bruce Goodwin
 2nd Vice President – Col. Anthony Stuart
 Chairperson – Col. Malaka Parker
 Deputy Chairperson – Col. Louis Rivera
 Secretary General – Col. Gatesworth James
 Deputy Secretary General – Col. Majorie Parchment
 Communications Officer – Col. Chaneil Imhoff
 Chief Financial Officer – Col. Gameal Joyce
 Deputy Financial Officer – Col. Coady Joseph
 Mobilization Officer – Col. Kelton Dalso

Electoral Results

References

Political parties established in 2017
Political parties in Antigua and Barbuda